Mavis Moyo is a veteran broadcaster of Radio Zimbabwe (ZBC Radio 4) and a founding member of the Federation of African Media Women Zimbabwe (FAMWZ 1985). During the 1980s and 1990s she was leading a project, which became known as Development Through Radio (DTR) across Zimbabwe and the entire Southern African region.

Personal life 

Mavis Moyo, born Mavis Zulu on 17 July 1929,  lives in Harare and is the mother of seven children, six sons and a daughter. She is still involved in consultancy work and sits on several Media boards .

Early life 
Mavis Moyo was born and grew up in Esigodini ("Essexvale"), a village in Matabeleland, 43 km South-East of Bulawayo, Zimbabwe's second largest city. Educated and working as a teacher for about 12 years,
she first got involved in the Media in 1954 by chance as a temporary replacement at what was then the Federal Broadcasting Corporation (FBC), and was kept as a part-timer. Initially this work entailed reading inserts in Ndebele for a women's program called "radio home-craft club" (RHC).
Later, a vacancy arose, she applied and got the post of an announcer.

Career as broadcaster
For many years, Moyo was one of very few women broadcasters, black or white, in colonial Zimbabwe. In 1968 she was the first woman to read the news on the Rhodesian Broadcasting Corporation (RBC) African Service. On 4 October 1982, Moyo was appointed to spearhead the establishment of ZBC's Radio 4 dedicated to education and rural development.
In over 50 years in radio, she is credited with pioneering participatory techniques of broadcasting and development through women's programs like RHC. In the late 1980s, Moyo's radio drama Changes came third in a competition organised by the Union of Radio and Television Organizations in Africa (URTNA).

As a broadcaster and an African woman from rural Matabeleland herself,
she quickly recognised the power of radio as a means of communication and imparting knowledge among rural communities in Africa and especially for the women who are often the once running the farms and working in the rural area when men migrate to cities to find paid jobs. 
“I realized that [radio] was a powerful tool of communication. As a teacher, I was imparting knowledge to about forty to four hundred people in the class but with radio I could teach the whole country."

Work and achievements
Mavis Moyo has been instrumental in the formation of the Federation of African Media Women, beginning with a consultative meeting of media women in Lusaka, Zambia in 1977, with participants from, among other countries, Kenya, Tanzania, Uganda, Zambia, and Zimbabwe. The Zimbabwe Media women launched their own national federation (FAMWZ), when in 1985, they went to the International Women's Conference in Nairobi, Kenya with a draft of their own constitution at hand. Moyo says since then, FAMWZ's focus has been the development of media women and other women in the urban and rural areas of the country. The increased local and regional activities and networking among African media women lead to FAMW-SADC being formed in 1992.
In 1988, FAMWZ, with Moyo as chairperson, launched the rural radio listening club project DTR.

Development through radio
In an interview with radio continental drift in 2012, Moyo emphasises how what became known as DTR or Development Through Radio grew from the seed of a collaboration and exchange between urban and rural women, initially between the Jamuranai Women's Club in the Harare township of Highfield and rural women from Seke district South of Harare.
It was this relation between women across urban-rural divides, which developed into an early precedence of participatory radio in Africa to an unprecedented scale. It is thanks to the leadership of Mavis Moyo, the eager persistence of her and some of her colleagues at ZBC Radio 4, carried on and further by FAMWZ members through persistent outreach training, as much as the very eagerness of the rural women groups themselves, that radio listening clubs could be established all over the country.
Support from UNESCO and the Friedrich Ebert Foundation helped to run and maintain the project,
which had the backing of the Ministries of Information, Post and Telecommunications, and Community- and Cooperative Development and Women's Affairs.

A 2009 report by the Open Society Initiative, "Public Broadcasting in Africa" makes mention of the project under the leadership of FAMWZ as Radio Zimbabwe's best known broadcasting initiative. "The project created radio listening clubs involving rural women who would gather to listen to programs by and about themselves. It was hoped that opinion leaders would emerge from the radio listening clubs who would then relay this development information to others."

After leaving the Zimbabwe Broadcasting Corporation, Mavis Moyo worked tirelessly in support of DTR projects across the Southern African region, such as in South Africa's Kwa-Zulu Natal, Mozambique, Malawi, Namibia and Angola.

Vision and legacy
Throughout the interview with radio continental drift, Moyo emphasises on the segregation of women out off a patriarchal society, their exclusion from any posts of influence, and from the Media in particular.
As she talks, the response of her life's work seems to be the active call for women to unite: for the media women to unite across specialisation and professions; for the women of Zimbabwe to come together across urban and rural divides; for women across Southern Africa to unite across national differences and join hands and voices for media participation of women across their continent and societies.

In the transcript of an interview with Moyo about the history of FAMWZ, published by Kubatana Network in Harare, she concludes with the statement: "we want to see media women taking their rightful places as managers in the media and establishing their own newspapers, magazines and broadcasting stations and film industries. They have the capacity to do this and also to run media training schools. There is a very strong movement of women who have a desire to tap on these fields."

References

External links
 Federation of Africa Media Women Zimbabwe (FAMWZ)

1929 births
Living people
Women radio journalists
Zimbabwean journalists
Zimbabwean women journalists
Place of birth missing (living people)
Zimbabwean activists
Zimbabwean women activists
20th-century Zimbabwean writers
21st-century Zimbabwean writers
20th-century Zimbabwean women writers
21st-century Zimbabwean women writers